Opeti Turuva (born Nadi, 8 June 1967) is a Fijian former rugby union player. He played as Fullback.

Career
His first international cap for Fiji was during a test match against Hong Kong, at Hong Kong, on 5 December 1990. Turuva was also called up for the 1991 Rugby World Cup roster, where he played only against Romania, where he scored the third drop goal in the match. His last cap for Fiji was against USA, in San Francisco, on 22 May 1999.
He played for Nadi until 1994, when he played the National Provincial Championship in New Zealand for King Country.

Notes

External links

Fiji international rugby union players
Fijian rugby union players
Rugby union fullbacks
Sportspeople from Nadi
1967 births
Living people
Fijian expatriates in New Zealand
I-Taukei Fijian people